Cần Giờ is a coastal suburban district of Ho Chi Minh City, in the Southeast region of Vietnam.

The district is located 50 km from downtown Ho Chi Minh City. As of 2010, the district had an area of 704 km² and population of 70,697, comprising Kinh people (80%), Khmer Krom and Cham people.
Cần Giờ is home to Cần Giờ Mangrove Forest, a biosphere reserve listed by UNESCO.

Geographical location
Cần Giờ borders Nhà Bè district to the north, Long An and Tiền Giang provinces to the west, Đồng Nai province to the northeast, Bà Rịa–Vũng Tàu province to the southeast, and the East Sea to the south. The district is bordered on the West by the Soai Rap river, which currently connects through the Binh Khanh Ferry Terminal, with plans to construct the Cần Giờ Bridge.

Administration
Cần Giờ district includes the town of Cần Thạnh and six communes:

References

Districts of Ho Chi Minh City